William S. Peirce may refer to:
 William S. Peirce (United States Army officer)

See also
 William S. Peirce School, Philadelphia, Pennsylvania
 William S. Pierce, cardiothoracic surgeon and chemical engineer